Algaecide or algicide is a biocide used for killing and preventing the growth of algae, often defined in a loose sense that, beyond the biological definition, also includes cyanobacteria ("blue-green algae"). An algaecide may be used for controlled bodies of water (reseviors, golf ponds, swimming pools), but may also be used on land for locations such as turfgrass.

Types

Inorganic compounds 
Some inorganic compounds are known since antiquity for their algicidal action due to their simplicity.

 Copper(II) sulfate remains "the most effective algicidal treatment". A related traditional use is the Bordeaux mixture, used to control fungus on fruits.
 Hydrated lime, as a biocide, is allowed in the production of organic foods.

Barley straw 
Barley straw, in England, is placed in mesh bags and floated in fish ponds or water gardens to help reduce algal growth without harming pond plants and animals. Barley straw has not been approved by the United States Environmental Protection Agency (EPA) for use as a pesticide and its effectiveness as an algaecide in ponds has produced mixed results during university testing in the United States and England. It is unclear how straw actually works.

Synthetic algicides
Synthetic algicides include:
 benzalkonium chloride – "quat" disinfectant that attacks membranes
 bethoxazin – "new broad spectrum industrial microbicide" in 2012, noted as "Canceled in U.S." in 2022 PubChem-EPA query
 cybutryne – banned since 2023 in ship paint
 dichlone – quinone fungicide/algaecide, not persistent in soil
 dichlorophen – also kills invertebrate animals and bacteria
 diuron – herbicide/algaecide, inhibits photosynthesis
 endothal – herbicide/algaecide, inhibits protein phosphatase 2A
 fentin – quinone fungicide/algaecide, discontinued
 isoproturon – selective substituted urea herbicide, discontinued
 methabenzthiazuron – substituted urea herbicide, discontinued
 nabam – fungicide/algicide discontinued in the EU over cancer
 oxyfluorfen – herbicide, "very toxic to aquatic life with long lasting effects"
 pentachlorophenyl laurate
 quinoclamine – herbicide/algicide, not used in most of the EU
 quinonamid
 simazine – herbicide/algaecide, inhibits photosynthesis
 terbutryn
 Tiodonium

References

External links
 National Pesticide Information Center (NPIC) Information about pesticide-related topics.